The Catacombs of Lima are underground ossuaries in the historic centre of Lima, Peru. The catacombs were built under the Basilica and Convent of San Francisco and currently function as a museum.

History
In 1546, the Franciscan order began construction of the Basilica and Convent of San Francisco in Lima, which included the catacombs, built to support the convent in the event of an earthquake. The crypt's use as a cemetery continued for almost the entirety of the Spanish era of Peru, stopping in 1810 with some 25,000 bodies lying within.

After the, Peruvian War of Independence, the cemetery's use was banned by General José de San Martín, with the area being closed off soon after. It would not be reopened until 1950, now working as a museum. It was closed a second time during the COVID-19 pandemic in Peru

In 1981, attempts to map the entirety of the complex led to the aforementioned conclusion of the total area being unknown. According to experts commissioned by the Peruvian State, the tunnels' likely purpose was protection against piracy of the area's locals and safekeeping of valuables.

The San Francisco complex, which includes the catacombs, is one of the most important heritage monuments in the historic centre of Lima, which was declared on December 9, 1988, as a World Heritage Site by UNESCO.

Notable burials
Constantino de Vasconcellos
Manuel de Oms, 24th Viceroy of Peru and 1st Marquess of Castelldosrius
García Sarmiento de Sotomayor, 16th Viceroy of Peru and 2nd Count of Salvatierra
Fr. Juan Gómez, personal nurse of Francis Solanus, known due to Ricardo Palma's Tradiciones Peruanas
Fr. Ramón y Tagle y Bracho, son of José Bernardo de Tagle y Bracho, 1st Marquis of Torre Tagle
Fr. Andrés Corso, who was born in Corsica and died in the convent on June 10, 1620
Fr. José Francisco de Guadalupe Mojica, O.F.M.

See also

Historic Centre of Lima
List of World Heritage Sites in Peru

References

Cemeteries in Peru
Catacombs
Cultural heritage of Peru